Montage is the second studio album by Hong Kong singer Charlene Choi. It was released on July 24, 2012.

Background
Montage was recorded since 2011 to mid-2012 and finally released on July 24. It contains re-release of her 2008 single "2 - 1".

Release
 July 24, 2012 (Standard Edition) (Cantonese and Mandarin Edition)
 July 31, 2012 (Regular Edition CD/DVD)

Track listing
"2 - 1"
"Ming Ming"
"Rilakkuma"
"Grow Old Together"
"Hopefully Tomorrow a Wake Up Doomsday"
"Vanuat"
"Species Me"
"Dog Grace Song"
"Train Through the Mountain"
"Leftover Ladies Afraid Combat"

DVD (Regular Edition)
"Ming Ming" (music video)
"Grow Old Together" (music video)

Mandarin Edition
"Two Minus One"
"Obviously"
"Relaxed Bear"
"Until the Death Do Us Part"
"Hopefully Tomorrow a Wake Up Doomsday"
"Vanuatu"
"Grow Me"
"Ode to Dogs"
"Train Passes Through the Tunnel"
"Bachelorettes Fear Combat"

References

External links
 http://www.jpopasia.com/celebrity/charlenechoi/lyrics/montage::25162.html
 http://www.ihonhon.com/2012/07/charlene-choi-montage.html
 https://itunes.apple.com/us/album/montage/id545611830
 http://www.yesasia.com/us/montage-cd-dvd-regular-edition/1031255412-0-0-0-en/info.html

2012 albums
Charlene Choi albums